Brentwood Secondary College is a co-educational, public high school, located in Glen Waverley, Victoria, Australia.

Glen Waverley South Primary School adjoins the college, and they have their own oval, which is used for many sport activities such as cricket, soccer and Australian football.

History
Brentwood Secondary College opened in 1969.

In recent years, the number of students attending the college has increased. Brentwood currently has about 1535 students enrolled in years 7 to 12. The year levels are divided into junior school (years 7-9) and senior school (years 11 and 12) with 2-year level coordinators for each year level respectively.

Each sub-school will be led by a head of school and supported by 2 student managers for each sub-school year level.

Facilities 
In 2006, a major redevelopment of the college's facilities to the science, mathematics, gymnasium. This complex costing in excess of $4 million was spent, with the government contributing $2.49 million and the college community contributing $1.74 million. The upgrades included new science and mathematics class rooms, a new gymnasium with physical education teaching rooms with an up stairs table tennis area.

The college consists of four "block" buildings, a performance centre and a gym and multiple portable classrooms.

Brentwood currently has 4 computer labs and a Mac lab in addition to the computers in the Library.

Brentwood currently has a gymnasium, weights room, a mezzanine for boxing and table tennis and the Hall, utilised for Productions and various classes offered at the College.

Thinking, Learning and Creativity Project
Brentwood Secondary College was successful in gaining funds from the Victorian Government through the Leading Schools Funding program to develop and trial a new educational program which may be used as a model for other schools.

Thinking, Learning and Creativity (TLC) is a core subject for year 7 students which combine studies in English, History, Geography and Information and Communication Technology for 9 periods per week. The TLC project is an innovation to Brentwood's year 7 Curriculum introduced in 2007.

The construction of a specially designed, technology rich TLC centre was completed in 2007 and formally declared open by Maxine Morand, Minister for Children and Early Childhood Development, Minister for Women's Affairs and Member for Mount Waverley.

Curriculum
In year 7, students complete Mathematics, English, a Language (Japanese or German), Science and Physical Education for the whole year with a semester of History, Geography, Music and Art.

During the middle years students are able to choose from a selection of semester (two terms) length studies, with the only mandatory subjects being Mathematics, English, Science and Humanities. Subjects on offer are: “English , Mathematics, Science, Commerce, Geography, History, German, Japanese, Art, Music, Drama, Physical Education, Health, Woodwork, Food Technology, Textiles, Information Technology, and Technology” (Brentwood Secondary College website).

Brentwood Secondary College currently offers a number of VCE subjects. The College does well in VCE (Victorian Certificate of Education) with many students receiving high ENTERs (Equivalent National Tertiary Entrance Rank).

Languages programme 
Students are required to complete 2 years of language study. Brentwood Secondary College's Languages programme offers Japanese and German.

Brentwood Secondary College has a sister school in Japan. In alternating years Ono Senior High School and Brentwood send students to the other school to be hosted by students' families. Brentwood also has a similar exchange program with Erasmus Gymnasium in Denzlingen, Germany.

Music 
Brentwood has an extensive Instrumental Music Program. Students have a choice to learn an instrument and tuitions offered are: Violin, Viola, Cello, Piano, Voice, Trumpet, Trombone, Clarinet, Flute, Saxophone and Drums. Once students are ready to go into ensembles, they are expected to perform in music concerts which Brentwood conducts. Notable ones are the Gala Night, Spring Soiree and Presentation Night.

Sport 
Brentwood Secondary College offers a number of sports such as tennis, cricket, table tennis, hockey, and more. It boasts a number of facilities to suit students individual sporting likes. Students are welcome to join sport teams which compete against other government schools.

Notable alumni
George Lambadaridis (2009) – Soccer player for Brisbane Roar
Madeleine Hogan (2006) – Australian Paralympic athlete
Troy Williams (1990) – CEO of Independent Tertiary Education Council Australia and Federal Liberal Election Candidate
Lin Jong- AFL Footballer
Rob Mills- Actor, currently in the Australian show Neighbours
Isabella Clarke (future class of 2022) - Highest-placing Australian representative at the Junior Eurovision Song Contest

References 
 
 
  
 

Specific

External links 
 Brentwood Secondary College: Official website
 Ono Senior High School: Sister School's Official website (both in Japanese and in English)

Rock Eisteddfod Challenge participants
Public high schools in Melbourne
Educational institutions established in 1969
1969 establishments in Australia
Buildings and structures in the City of Monash
Glen Waverley, Victoria